Asylemissa is a monotypic moth genus of the family Erebidae. Its only species, Asylemissa comma, is known from north-eastern Thailand. Both the genus and the species were first described by Michael Fibiger in 2010.

The wingspan is about 8 mm. The head, patagia, anterior part of the tegulae, prothorax, basal part of the costa, costal part of the medial area and fringes are blackish brown. The costal medial area is quadrangular. The forewing is short, narrow and pointed at the apex. The ground colour is yellow suffused with brown scales and with a black tornal patch. The crosslines are partly indistinct and light brown. The terminal line is also indistinct and indicated by a few black interneural dots. The hindwing is grey, without a discal spot. The underside of the forewing is light brown, while the underside of the hindwing is light grey.

References

Micronoctuini
Noctuoidea genera
Monotypic moth genera